Consophia is a steel sculpture by Ian Lazarus, located at the Windsor Sculpture Park in Windsor, Ontario.

Lazarus's 18-foot-tall sculpture represents communication across borders. The Native Ojibway script translates to sharing knowledge as well as inspired interaction, referring to the proximity of Windsor with Detroit.

References 

Outdoor sculptures in Canada
Culture of Windsor, Ontario
Steel sculptures in Canada